A Royal Fellow of the Royal Society is a member of the British royal family who has been elected a Fellow of the Royal Society. The council of the Royal Society recommends members of the Royal Family to be elected and then the existing Fellows vote by a secret ballot whether to accept them. The ballots have only a box to tick supporting the measure; those opposing have to write "no" or otherwise mark or spoil the paper.  the Patron was Queen Elizabeth II, and Royal Fellows were:

Charles III, elected 1978
Anne, Princess Royal, elected 1987
Prince Edward, Duke of Kent, elected 1990
William, Prince of Wales, elected 2009

The British Monarch is always the Patron of the Royal Society, regardless of whether he/she has been previously elected a Royal Fellow. Queen Elizabeth II was elected a Royal Fellow in 1947 before she acceded to the throne in 1952. Prince Philip, Duke of Edinburgh was not a Royal Fellow as he was elected under statute 12 in 1951.

Criticism of Royal Fellows
When Prince Andrew was elected in 2013 his suitability was questioned following criticism of his past business activities. Some members asked whether it was time for an institution based on science to end the practice of honouring people on the basis of a heredity principle; Professor David Colquhoun FRS said "The objects of the Royal Society are nothing to do with the monarchy, and the monarchy, on the whole, has shown absolutely no interest in science". Andrew was later stripped of his military appointments and royal patronages in 2022.

In the past, members of foreign royal families have also been elected Royal Fellows.

Royal Fellows of the Royal Society since 1660 

 Ferdinand Albert I, Duke of Brunswick-Lüneburg
 Albert, Prince Consort
 Alfred, Duke of Saxe-Coburg and Gotha
 Anne, Princess Royal
 Prince Arthur of Connaught
 Prince Arthur, Duke of Connaught and Strathearn
 Prince Augustus Frederick, Duke of Sussex
 Charles Frederick, Grand Duke of Baden
 Charles, Prince of Wales
 Christian VII of Denmark
 Christian VIII of Denmark
 Edward VII
 Edward VIII
 Prince Edward, Duke of York and Albany
 Prince Edward, Duke of Kent
 Queen Elizabeth The Queen Mother
 Elizabeth II (as Princess Elizabeth, Duchess of Edinburgh)
 Ernest Augustus, King of Hanover
 Frederick Augustus II of Saxony
 Frederick, Prince of Wales
 Prince Frederick, Duke of York and Albany
 Frederick William IV of Prussia
 George I of Great Britain
 George II of Great Britain
 George III of the United Kingdom
 George IV of the United Kingdom
 George V
 George VI
 Prince George of Denmark
 Gustaf VI Adolf of Sweden
 Prince Henry, Duke of Cumberland and Strathearn
 Prince Henry, Duke of Gloucester
 Archduke John of Austria
 Leopold I of Belgium
 Archduke Louis of Austria
 Maximilian I Joseph of Bavaria
 Archduke Maximilian of Austria–Este
 Oscar I of Sweden
 Pedro II of Brazil
 Michał Jerzy Poniatowski
 Stanisław August Poniatowski
 Prince Rupert of the Rhine
 Queen Victoria
 William IV of the United Kingdom
 William IV, Prince of Orange
 Prince William Frederick, Duke of Gloucester and Edinburgh
 Prince William Henry, Duke of Gloucester and Edinburgh
 Prince William, Duke of Cumberland
 Prince William, Duke of Cambridge

References

Royal Society
Fellows of the Royal Society